The ȘOR Party is a populist political party in Moldova.

Known from its foundation in 1998 until October 2016 as the Socio-Political Movement "Equality", the party holds Eurosceptic and Russophilic stances.

History 
The party was founded in 1998 by Moldovan politician Valery Klymenko as the "Socio-Political Movement "Equality". At the 2005 Moldovan parliamentary election, the party won 3.8% of the popular vote but no seats. The party intended to participate to the 2014 Moldovan parliamentary election but later withdrew its list.

In 2015, the party decided to nominate Ilan Shor for Mayor of the town of Orhei. Shor, who was at that point in time under house arrest, won a majority of the votes in the first round of the election and subsequently became the leading figure within the party. In October 2016, Shor was elected president of the party, which was renamed Șor Party. On 1 December 2018, the party joined the Alliance of Conservatives and Reformists in Europe.

In December 2018, the party created a model collective farm based on its own election program in the Orhei region, dubbing it the "Commune of Dreams".

At the 2019 Moldovan parliamentary election, the party 8.32% of votes and elected seven MPs, entering parliament for the first time in its history. The party organized a Victory Day parade in Chișinău on 9 May 2019.

The Șor Party was the main instigator of the 2022–2023 Moldovan protests.

On 8 November 2022, the Moldovan government requested the constitutional court to initiate proceedings for the outlawing of the party in Moldova, due to it allegedly promoting the interests of a foreign state and harming the independence and sovereignty of the country.

Ideology 
The party's 2019 program the following introduced points:
 Free universal health care.
 Free education including higher education.
 Increasing the size and scope of disability benefits, maternity benefits and retirement pensions.
 The creation of modernised collective farms to work alongside the private sector.
 Active state intervention in the spheres of infrastructure, transport, energy, communications, housing, pharmaceuticals, etc.
 The nationalization of foreign-owned energy companies.
 A commitment to law and order including both reinstating the death penalty for particularly dangerous criminals and addressing the underlying socioeconomic issues that may cause crime.
 A commitment to Moldovan independence and military neutrality.

The opening paragraphs of the party's 2008 election program stated that it viewed the average person's quality of life as superior under the Soviet Union when compared to modern times. It further stated that it viewed Moldova's socio-economic problems as relating to Moldova's negative relationship with the Russian Federation. As of 2021, the party supports moving the capital to Orhei.

Leadership 

 Ilan Shor – President; MP
 Valerii Klimenko – Honorary President; Member of the Chișinău Municipal Council
 Maria Albot – Secretary-General
 Marina Tauber – Vice President; MP

Electoral results

Parliament

Presidency

References

External links 
 Official political program 

1998 establishments in Moldova
Political parties established in 1998
Russian political parties in Moldova